Maamanithan is a 2022 Indian Tamil-language drama film written and directed by Seenu Ramasamy and produced by Yuvan Shankar Raja under his YSR Productions banner. The film stars Vijay Sethupathi, Gayathrie, K. P. A. C. Lalitha, Guru Somasundaram, Anikha Surendran, Jewel Mary and Shaji Chen. In addition, Yuvan composed the soundtrack of this film along with his father, Ilaiyaraaja. The cinematography and editing were handled by M. Sukumar and A. Seekar Prasad

The film was theatrically released on 24 June 2022 after being delayed for five years and received critical acclaim from critics and audience.

Plot
The film begins with Radhakrishnan hiding from the police, who are visiting the area. He then begins running through the village and into the fields. Then we see a flashback of Radhakrishnan's life and how
he came to the situation of having to run. Radhakrishnan is a humble auto driver, who is sincere and extremely honest. He is content with his life which revolves around the auto, his wife Savithri, and his 2 kids. He has a good friend, Bhai. 
His kids study in a government school, and he wishes to improve their standard of education by admitting them into a private school. He always teaches his kids good morals. 

He also reveals his love story to his daughter, how he fell in love with Savithri. One day, he took an old man to the bus station. However, he left some gold jewellery behind in Radakrishnan's auto. They visit a gold jewellery store, and find
that the old man purchased the jewellery for his daughter. The old man's name was Maarisaamy. Radhakrishnan and his friend visit his house and give the jewellery to him. Maarisaamy reveals that he brought the jewellery for
his daughter's engagement ceremony and wedding. After that, one day, he meets Savirthri at a bus stand. He finds the alliance got cancelled because they feared the groom's family might ask for more dowry. 

Radhakrishnan, Mayilu (a house broker), and Vappa Bhai helps Savithri and her father find a new home. At the same time, Krishna falls in love with Savithri. One day, Maarisaamy complains to Krishna after Savithri's brother visits him while on leave, 
and the landlord blasts music loudly. Radhakrishnan helps him find four suitable grooms, and smartly puts his horoscope in the pile and gives it to Maarisaamy. Krishna
then tells Bhai that they accepted him as a suitable groom. So Bhai shows Maarisaamy Krishna's newly built house, that he made for his upcoming wife. Bhai tells him about Krishna's parents and how they have died. 
When his mother was alive, they tried to find a bride for him, but he wanted to marry a educated girl. Bhai persuades Maarisaamy that Krishna will care Savithri dearly. Eventually Maarisaamy decides to accept the engagement. On the day of the
engagement, Krishna, Mayilu, Bhai and Krishna's maternal uncle visit Maarisaamy's house for Savithri's hand in marriage. Savithri's brother insults Radhakrishnan's job as a auto driver, and throws a coconut at him and gets in a fight with him.
Krishna tells his friends to look at his skill, not the job. Bhai convinces him to bring Savithri and he will get them married. Radhakrishnan then goes Savithri's house, to see her trying to kill her own brother. He then brings her. Later, Krishna and
Savithri gets married at the temple. The love flashback comes to an end. 

One day, when taking his kids to school, he sees a plot of land being worked on by builders. A man tells Krishna that a Malayali man brought a piece of land, and the school teachers want to buy it. He then tells that he knows the town, and if you
help him sell, you can get commission to help his children's standard of education by admitting them into a private school. To achieve this, he promises a real estate businessman Madhavan that he'll help him sell all the plots to his villagers. He
turns into a house broker, but his wife convinces him that this might not seem a right route. Eventually, Radhakrishnan sells all the properties, and Madhavan collects all the money. Krishnan gets drunk with Madhavan, and his wife gets angry. However, 
the next day, Krishnan gets cheated since Madhavan runs away with the money. Krishnan becomes confused, since he feels that he has betrayed his villagers because they trusted his word. It then returns to the beginning of the film. Madhavan's good-hearted
assistant tells him that Madhavan's house is in Kerala.

The consequences he and his family face and the extent to which Radhakrishnan goes to find Madhavan forms the rest of the film.

Cast

Production

Development 
In April 2017, reports surfaced that Vijay Sethupathi had signed a new project with Seenu Ramasamy after the success of Dharma Durai (2016). Seenu Ramasamy started writing the script for the project with a tentative title Maamanithan, with Yuvan Shankar Raja who earlier collaborated with Seenu in Dharma Durai and the unreleased film Idam Porul Yaeval, expressed his interest in producing the film apart from working on the film's music. Later, Seenu also narrated the script to composer Ilaiyaraaja who also agreed to work with his son Yuvan.

It was further reported that the film biopic of a popular leader who hails from the south Tamil Nadu region, with Vijay Sethupathi playing a politician in the film, however the team denied such claims. Seenu Ramasamy finished working on the script within May 2017, but shooting of the film delayed due to Sethupathi's commitments in other films.

Casting 
Samuthirakani was announced for a pivotal character in April 2018, who plays a straightforward villager in the film. Seenu Ramasamy revealed that "his character will be the silent type, with very little dialogue and there will be no pair for him in the film". Though the film marked Samuthirakani and Seenu collaborating after Neerparavai (2012), the former did not confirm his presence in the film. During the start of the shoot, Guru Somasundaram was announced a part of the pivotal cast, with Seenu stating his character as an important one which appears throughout the film. Guru Somasundaram played the role of a Muslim in the film.

Seenu also cast Gayathrie playing for another pivotal character. He stated that "her role is that of a young woman who has finished her 10th standard and has taken up teaching typewriting". Other supporting casts include K. P. A. C. Lalitha, Shaji Chen, Jewel Mary.

Manasvi Kottachi was cast as Sethupathi's daughter. Anikha was cast in a supporting role. During the schedule of Kerala, stills featuring Vijay Sethupathi and Malayalam actor Manikandan Achari went viral through internet, with the latter reported to play a supporting role in the film. Vijay Sethupathi plays an auto driver hailing from a rural family in the film.

Filming 
The film's shooting began in Madurai with a formal pooja (prayer ceremony) on 15 December 2018. The first schedule of the film began in Andipatti, near Madurai which took place for 20 days. On 23 January 2019, the team headed to Kerala to shoot few major sequences for the film. The Kerala schedule was completed in 13 days and the team shot few more sequences in Varanasi during early February and was wrapped on 12 February 2019. The entire filming was completed in 37 days.

Music 
The film marked the first time collaboration of Ilaiyaraaja and his son Yuvan Shankar Raja working together. Ilaiyaraaja's inclusion in the project was announced on 25 January 2018, when he was felicitated with Padma Vibushan by the Government of India, Yuvan stated that the collaboration with his father and brother, made his "journey of a music director being meaningful and purposeful". The film's director Seenu Ramasamy also thanked Yuvan for his initiative in bringing the Raja family collaborate on a project, in his interview with The Times of India.

Recording for the film's soundtrack began during September 2019, and completed in May 2020. The album featuring five songs had lyrics written by Pa. Vijay and Palani Bharathi. Ilaiyaraaja took charge of recording the songs and film score, while Yuvan did the arrangements for the soundtrack. The first single track "Thattiputta" was released by U1 Records on 7 April 2021, which had vocals performed by Ilaiyaraaja and written by Pa. Vijay. Another song "Ye Rasa" was released on 28 May 2021, which also had a promotional video featuring Yuvan Shankar Raja.

Release

Theatrical 
The film was scheduled for a theatrical release during September and October 2019, but was delayed indefinitely due to a lawsuit filed against the producers by Jayaseelan who earlier registered the same title for his film. In March 2021, Seenu Ramasamy tweeted that Yuvan Shankar Raja had acquired the title rights from Jayaseelan and further stated that the promotions will begin for the film under the title Maamanithan. The producers started negotiating with streaming platforms for a direct digital release, as theatres being shut down due to the COVID-19 pandemic. LetsOTT revealed that the film is scheduled for a digital release through ZEE5 which purchased the digital rights, although no official confirmation has been made by the producers. The film was theatrically released on 24 June 2022.

Distribution 
Both the Tamil Nadu and the Kerala distribution rights of the film has been bagged by R. K. Suresh under the banner Studio 9 Productions.

Home Media 
The digital rights of the film has been acquired by Aha Tamil, while the satellite rights of the film has been acquired by Zee Tamil.

Reception
Srivatsan S of The Hindu after reviewing the film wrote "Just watch the man when he gets a meet-cute scene with Savithri or when he bursts out in anger at his to-be brother-in-law. Vijay Sethupathi makes it look genuine. Maamanithan is that script where both Sethupathi and Gayathrie do more for the film than what it does to them." Karthik Keramalu of Firstpost after reviewing the film stated "The new troubles for Sethupathi and Gayathrie are a far cry from the ones they encountered in Naduvula Konjam Pakkatha Kaanom (2012). In the decade that has passed since then, they have grown as actors individually, and as an on-screen couple that we can all shower our love upon." M Suganth of The Times of India gave 3.0 out of 5 stars and stated "Also, in these times when big-screen entertainment has largely come to mean action thrillers and fantasies, Maamanithan — a character-driven drama - does feel like the last of its species. And by the time that it ends, it turns into something more — a saga that is quietly affecting."

Manoj Kumar R of The Indian Express rated 3 out of 5 stars stating that "Maamanithan is Seenu Ramasamy's meditation on life. And according to him, the man who knows to be content living on less is great." Sudhir Srinivasan of Cinema Express gave 3.5 out of 5 stars stating that "The film is also a bit too keen to celebrate its protagonist as a selfless saint. Perhaps he is one, but it feels like there are other characters who deserve as much acknowledgement. Radhakrishnan's Muslim friend is a bit of a saint himself. And why, even Savithri, who has endured hardship all her life, has done a lot for their children. And yet, it feels like she doesn't quite get her due. But as I said, these are nuances, and in a film that never really has you riveted in its universe, does it matter? It's a pity because we don't get a lot of these films that speak of how greatness in our world is often found in the most unassuming of people, who quietly sacrifice themselves, so people around them can live better lives." Janani K of India Today gave the film 2.5 out of 5 and stated "Overall, Maamanithan is a moving drama with its heart in the right place." Soundarya Athimuthu of The Quint after reviewing the film stated that "Maamanithan has its heart at the right place for it instills hope in human relationships, explaining while there may be one or two who will cheat or hurt you, there will be dozens waiting to support and embrace you with love." Indiaglitz gave the film's rating 3 out of 5.0 and wrote "Go for this one for the solid performances of the cast and the relatable story moments."

Behindwoods rated 2.75 out of 5 and wrote "Maamanithan is a beautiful family drama, watch it for Ilayaraja - YSR's blissful music and the performances." Hariharan Krishnan of Film Companion wrote "And then you have Somasundaram playing Ismail, Sethupathi's best friend and saviour of the abandoned family. Honestly what a relief it is to see a Muslim character given some importance in an Indian film. This kind of inclusivity had almost been given up as a lost cause. I sincerely hope that other filmmakers in the future take this lead and start developing more characters from the Muslim community. And then we have Jewel Mary playing Pilomy a tea vendor in the backwaters of Alleppey, who accommodates Radhakrishnan. What a radiant presence. She's one of the rare actors who just does not perform or exert herself to play her role. So, what could have been a well-crafted Hitchcockian drama of a small lower-middle-class family facing a crisis beyond their comprehension, loses track and becomes a rather confused affair. So, let's just blame it on the inconveniences caused by the pandemic of the last two years on a crew, which was ill-equipped also to handle their crisis, too." India Herald rated the film 3 out of 4 and wrote "Maamanithan has a sense of being the last of its kind. When it finally comes to a finish, it evolves into something more—a narrative that is softly moving."

References 

Films scored by Ilaiyaraaja
Films scored by Yuvan Shankar Raja
Films scored by Karthik Raja
Indian drama films
Films shot in Kerala
Films shot in Madurai
Films directed by Seenu Ramasamy
Films shot in Varanasi